Sergey Kulyaba (Ukrainian: Сергей Куляба, born October 31, 1991) is a Ukrainian kickboxer. He is the winner of the 2018 Kunlun Fight 66kg tournament.

, he was ranked the #8 lightweight in the world by Liverkick.

Martial arts career
Kulyaba made his professional debut in December 2012, against Aleksei Ulianov, winning by decision. In the following three years, he went on a 8-3-2 run, achieving a notable victory over Bobo Sacko and a draw with Sak Kaoponlek. His first career title came in 2015, when he won the 2015 four man Partouche Kickboxing Tour tournament, knocking out Samir Mohamed and Bertrand Lambert.

Kulyaba then entered the worst run of form in his career up to that point, losing three fights in a row to Kem Sitsongpeenong, Jomthong Chuwattana and Chris Ngimbi. Following these losses, he participated in the 2016 Super Muaythai four man tournament, defeating Zhang Hu by TKO in the semifinals and Sanpet by decision in the final. Kulyaba won four of his next five fights, including an extra round decision win against Andrei Kulebin, before fighting the highest profile bout of his career, taking on Buakaw Banchamek at All Star Fight 2. He was unable to overcome the Thai legend, as Buakaw won a decision.

Despite the poor run of form following this fight, during which Kulyaba lost four of his five fights, Kulyaba was nonetheless given a chance to fight in the 2018 Kunlun Fight 66 kg Tournament. He defeated Jia Aoqi in the quarterfinal, Sun Zhixiang in the semifinal and Gu Hui in the final bout to take the tournament title.

Kulyaba fought just once in 2019, a failed title bid for Eddy Nait Slimani's La Nuit des Champions 66 kg title, as Slimani won the fight by split decision.

Achievements and accomplishments

Professional
Muay Thai
 2016 Super Muaythai 4-Man Tournament Winner

Kickboxing
Partouche Kickboxing
 2015 Partouche Kickboxing Tour 4-Man Tournament Winner

Kunlun Fight
 2018 Kunlun Fight -66kg World Tournament Champion

Amateur
International Federation of Muaythai Associations
2016 IFMA World Cup -67 kg 
2014 IFMA European Championships -67 kg 
2013 IFMA European Championships -67 kg 
2011 IFMA European Championships -67 kg 
2010 IFMA World Championships -63.5 kg 
2010 IFMA European Championships -63.5 kg 

World Combat Games
 2017 World Combat Games Muay Thai -67 kg 
 2013 World Combat Games Muay Thai -67 kg

Awards
 Ukraine's Best Muay Thai Athlete 2017

Fight record

|-  style="background:#FFBBBB;"
| 2019-11-16|| Loss||align=left| Eddy Nait Slimani || La Nuit Des Champions || France || Decision (Split) || 5 || 3:00
|-
! style=background:white colspan=9 |
|-  style="background:#cfc;"
| 2018-12-15|| Win ||align=left| Gu Hui || Kunlun Fight 79 – 66 kg Tournament, Final || China || Decision (Unanimous) || 3 || 3:00
|-
! style=background:white colspan=9 |
|-
|-  style="background:#cfc;"
| 2018-12-15|| Win ||align=left| Sun Zhixiang || Kunlun Fight 79 – 66 kg Tournament, Semi Finals || China || Decision (Unanimous) || 3 || 3:00
|-
|-  style="background:#cfc;"
| 2018-12-15|| Win ||align=left| Jia Aoqi || Kunlun Fight 79 – 66 kg Tournament, Quarter Finals || China || Decision (Unanimous) || 3 || 3:00
|-
|-  style="background:#FFBBBB;"
| 2018-08-05|| Loss ||align=left| Nordin Ben Moh || Kunlun Fight 75 || China || Decision || 3 || 3:00
|-
|-  style="background:#FFBBBB;"
| 2018-04-28|| Loss ||align=left| Petchtanong Banchamek || All Star Fight 3 || Thailand || Decision (Unanimous) || 3 || 3:00
|-
|-  style="background:#FFBBBB;"
| 2018-02-04|| Loss ||align=left| Superbon Banchamek || Kunlun Fight 69 – 70 kg Tournament, Semi Finals || China || Decision (Majority) || 3 || 3:00
|-
|-  style="background:#FFBBBB;"
| 2017-11-24|| Loss ||align=left| Davit Kiria || 2017 Kungfu World Cup -70 kg Semi-Finals || Paris, France || Decision (unanimous) || 3 || 3:00
|-
|-  style="background:#CCFFCC;"
| 2017-11-12|| Win ||align=left| Nikola Cimesa || Kunlun Fight 67 – 70 kg Tournament, Quarter Finals || China || Decision (Unanimous) || 3 || 3:00
|-
|-  style="background:#FFBBBB;"
| 2017-09-30|| Loss ||align=left| Buakaw Banchamek || All Star Fight 2 || Thailand || Decision (Unanimous) || 3 || 3:00
|-
|-  style="background:#CCFFCC;"
| 2017-08-27 || Win ||align=left| Andrei Kulebin || Kunlun Fight 65 World MAX Tournament Final 16 || Qingdao, China || Ext.R Decision (2-3) || 4 || 3:00 
|-
|-  style="background:#CCFFCC;"
| 2017-06-10 || Win ||align=left| Victor Nagbe || Kunlun Fight 62 || China || Decision (Unanimous) || 3 || 3:00 
|-
|-  style="background:#CCFFCC;"
| 2017-06-10 || Win ||align=left| Tian Xin || Kunlun Fight 62 || China || Decision (Unanimous) || 3 || 3:00 
|-
|-  style="background:#CCFFCC;"
| 2017-04-08 || Win ||align=left| Sebmune || Super Muaythai || Thailand || KO || 2 || 
|-
|-  style="background:#FFBBBB;"
| 2017-01-01|| Loss ||align=left| Gu Hui || Kunlun Fight 56 || China || Decision (Unanimous) || 3 || 3:00
|-
|-  style="background:#CCFFCC;"
| 2016-12-03 || Win ||align=left| Sanpet || Super Muaythai || Thailand || Decision || 3 || 3:00 
|-
! style=background:white colspan=9 |
|-
|-  style="background:#CCFFCC;"
| 2016-12-03 || Win ||align=left| Zhang Hu|| Super Muaythai || Thailand || TKO || 1 || 
|-
|-  style="background:#FFBBBB;"
| 2016-03-25 || Loss ||align=left| Chris Ngimbi || Kunlun Fight 40 || China || KO || 3 || 
|-
|-  style="background:#FFBBBB;"
| 2015-12-05|| Loss ||align=left| Jomthong Chuwattana || Super Muay Thai  || Bangkok, Thailand || Decision (Unanimous) || 3 || 3:00
|-
|-  bgcolor="#FFBBBB"
| 2015-10-17|| Loss ||align=left|  Kem Sitsongpeenong ||Top King World Series 7 Final 8|| China  || Decision|| 3 || 3:00
|-
|-  style="background:#CCFFCC;"
| 2015-09-04 || Win ||align=left| Tomoyuki Nishikawa || Top King World Series || Thailand || Decision || 3 || 3:00 
|-
|-  style="background:#CCFFCC;"
| 2015-07-31 || Win ||align=left| Bertrand Lambert || Partouche Kickboxing Tour || France || TKO || 3 || 
|-
! style=background:white colspan=9 | 
|-
|-  style="background:#CCFFCC;"
| 2015-07-31 || Win ||align=left| Samir Mohamed || Partouche Kickboxing Tour || France || TKO (Injury) || 2 ||  
|-
|-  style="background:#CCFFCC;"
| 2015-04-29 || Win ||align=left| Claudiu Badoi || Tatneft Cup 2015 - 1st Selection 1/4 Finals || Russia || Decision || 3 || 3:00  
|-
|-  style="background:#CCFFCC;"
| 2015-03-31 || Win ||align=left| Apti Bimarzaev || Tatneft Cup 2015 || Russia || Decision || 3 || 3:00  
|-
|-  style="background:#c5d2ea;"
| 2014-12-07 || Draw ||align=left| Superchamp Rajanon || Max Muay Thai Final Chapter || Thailand || Decision || 3 || 3:00  
|-
|-  style="background:#FFBBBB;"
| 2014-10-11 || Loss ||align=left| Dmitry Varats || W5 Grand Prix || Russia || Decision || 3 || 3:00  
|-
|-  style="background:#FFBBBB;"
| 2014-05-22 || Loss ||align=left| Artem Pashporin ||Grand Prix Russia Open || Russia || Decision (Unanimous) || 3 || 3:00  
|-
|-  style="background:#c5d2ea;"
| 2014-04-05 || Draw ||align=left| Sak Kaoponlek || Oktagon || Milan, Italy || Decision || 3 || 3:00  
|-
|-  style="background:#CCFFCC;"
| 2014-03-01 || Win ||align=left| Arthur Isayants || W5 Grand Prix Orel XXIV || Russia || Decision || 4 || 3:00  
|-
|-  style="background:#CCFFCC;"
| 2013-11-16 || Win ||align=left| Vasiliy Goral || W5 Grand Prix Orel || Russia || Decision || 3 || 3:00  
|-
|-  style="background:#CCFFCC;"
| 2013-11-10 || Win ||align=left| Bobo Sacko || Warriors Night || France || KO || 2 ||   
|-
|-  style="background:#CCFFCC;"
| 2013-04-24 || Win ||align=left| Dmitry Varats || W5 Grand Prix Orel XXI || Russia || Decision || 3 || 3:00  
|-
|-  style="background:#FFBBBB;"
| 2012-06-02 || Loss ||align=left| Erik Edvin Kibus || Tatneft Cup || Russia || Decision || 3 || 3:00  
|-
|-  style="background:#CCFFCC;"
| 2012-02-24 || Win ||align=left| Alexei Dodonov || Tatneft Cup - 1/8 Finals || Russia || Decision || 3 || 3:00  
|-
|-  style="background:#CCFFCC;"  
| 2012-12-08||Win||align=left|  Aleksei Ulianov ||  || Russia ||  Decision  || 3 || 3:00
|-  style="background:#fbb;"  
| 2010-05-08||Loss||align=left|  Rafael Fiziev ||  || Mytishchi, Russia ||  Decision  || 3 || 3:00 
|-
! style=background:white colspan=9 | 
|-
| colspan=9 | Legend:    

|-  style="background:#fbb;"
| 2019-07-26|| Loss||align=left| Erdem Dincer || I.F.M.A. World Championships 2019, Quarter Finals, -67 kg || Bangkok, Thailand || Decision (30:27) || 3 || 2:00
|-  style="background:#cfc;"
| 2019-07-24|| Win ||align=left| Marco Novak || I.F.M.A. World Championships 2019, Round of 16, -67 kg || Bangkok, Thailand || Decision (30:27) || 3 || 2:00
|-  style="background:#cfc;"
| 2019-07-22|| Win ||align=left| Rhyse Saliba || I.F.M.A. World Championships 2019, Round of 32, -67 kg || Bangkok, Thailand || Decision (29:28) || 3 || 2:00
|-  style="background:#fbb;"
| 2018-05-14|| Loss||align=left| Spéth Norbert Attila || I.F.M.A. World Championships 2018, Quarter Finals -67 kg || Cancun, Mexico || Decision (30:27) || 3 || 2:00
|-  style="background:#cfc;"
| 2018-05-12|| Win ||align=left| Ricardo Cruz || I.F.M.A. World Championships 2018, Eighth Finals -67 kg || Cancun, Mexico || Decision (30:27) || 3 || 2:00

|-  style="background:#cfc;"
| 2017-07-30 || Win ||align=left| Vladimir Kuzmin ||  I.F.M.A. World Muaythai at The World Games 2017, Final || Wroclaw, Poland || Decision (29:28) || 3 || 3:00
|-
! style=background:white colspan=9 |

|-  style="background:#cfc;"
| 2017-07-29 || Win ||align=left| Anueng Khatthamarasri ||  I.F.M.A. World Muaythai at The World Games 2017, Semi Finals || Wroclaw, Poland || Decision (29:28) || 3 || 3:00

|-  style="background:#cfc;"
| 2017-07-28 || Win ||align=left| Akram Al-Qaysi ||  I.F.M.A. World Muaythai at The World Games 2017, Quarter Finals || Wroclaw, Poland || RSC || 1 || 

|-  style="background:#cfc;"
| 2016-11-26|| Win ||align=left| Aleksei Ulianov|| IFMA World Cup 2016 in Kazan, Final || Kazan, Russia || Decision || 3 ||3:00
|-
! style=background:white colspan=9 |

|-  style="background:#cfc;"
| 2016-11-23|| Win ||align=left| Mustafa Saparmyradov|| IFMA World Cup 2016 in Kazan, Semi Final || Kazan, Russia || Decision || 3 ||3:00

|-  style="background:#cfc;"
| 2016-11-22|| Win ||align=left| Weerayut Chuaisaeng || IFMA World Cup 2016 in Kazan, Quarter Finals || Kazan, Russia || Decision || 3 ||3:00

|-  style="background:#fbb;"
| 2016-05-24|| Loss ||align=left| Ali Batmaz || I.F.M.A. World Championships 2016, Quarter Finals -67 kg || Jonkoping, Sweden || Decision (29:28) || 3 || 2:00
|-  style="background:#cfc;"
| 2016-05-21|| Win ||align=left| Victor Canto || I.F.M.A. World Championships 2016, Eighth Finals -67 kg || Jonkoping, Sweden || Decision (30:27) || 3 || 2:00
|-  style="background:#fbb;"
| 2015-08-14|| Loss||align=left| Fueangfu Piya || I.F.M.A. Royal World cup Tournament 2015, Quarter Finals -67 kg || Bangkok, Thailand || Decision  || 3 || 2:00
|-  style="background:#cfc;"
| 2015-08-14|| Win ||align=left| Péter Albrecht || I.F.M.A. Royal World cup Tournament 2015, Eighth Finals -67 kg || Bangkok, Thailand || TKO  || 2 ||   
|-  

|-  style="background:#FFBBBB;"
| 2014-09- || Loss || align=left| Andrei Kulebin  || 2014 IFMA European Championships, Semi Finals || Krakow, Poland || Decision || 3 || 3:00 
|-
! style=background:white colspan=9 |

|-  style="background:#cfc;"
| 2014-09- || Win || align=left| Martin Gromkiewicz || 2014 IFMA European Championships, Quarter Finals || Krakow, Poland || Decision || 3 || 3:00 

|-  style="background:#fbb;"
| 2014-05- || Loss || align=left| Somwang Sittisak || 2014 IFMA World Championships, 1/8 Finals || Langkawi, Malaysia || Decision || 3 || 3:00 

|-  style="background:#FFBBBB;"
| 2013-10-23 || Loss || align=left| Andrei Kulebin || SportAccord World Combat Games, Final || Saint-Petersburg, Russia || Decision || 3 || 3:00 
|-
! style=background:white colspan=9 |

|-  style="background:#cfc;"
| 2013-10-21 || Win|| align=left| Supachai Pansuvan || SportAccord World Combat Games, Semi Final|| Saint-Petersburg, Russia || Decision || 3 || 3:00 

|-  style="background:#cfc;"
| 2013-07-|| Win ||align=left| Andrei Kulebin || 2013 IFMA European Championship, Final || Lisbon, Portugal || Decision  || 4 || 2:00
|-
! style=background:white colspan=8 |

|-  style="background:#cfc;"
| 2013-07-27 || Win|| align=left| Khayal Dzhaniev || 2013 IFMA European Championship, Semi Finals|| Lisbon, Portugal || Decision || 4 || 2:00

|-  style="background:#cfc;"
| 2012-05-|| Win ||align=left| Aleksei Ulianov|| 2012 IFMA European Championship, Semi Finals || Antalya, Turkey || Doctor stoppage|| 1 ||

|-  style="background:#fbb;"
| 2011-09-23|| Loss ||align=left| Jeerasak Inudom || 2011 IFMA World Championships, Quarter Finals || Tashkent, Uzbekistan || Decision || 4 || 2:00

|-  style="background:#cfc;"
| 2011-09-21|| Win ||align=left| Kirilov Veselinov || 2011 IFMA World Championships || Tashkent, Uzbekistan || Decision || 4 || 2:00

|-  style="background:#FFBBBB;"
| 2011-04-28 || Loss ||align=left| Andrei Kulebin || I.F.M.A. European Muaythai Championships '11, Semi Finals -67 kg || Antalya, Turkey || || ||
|-
! style=background:white colspan=9 |

|-  style="background:#FFBBBB;"
| 2010-12- || Loss ||align=left| Panupan Tunjud || 2010 I.F.M.A. World Muaythai Championships, Finals || Bangkok, Thailand || Decision || 4||2:00
|-
! style=background:white colspan=9 |
|-  style="background:#cfc;"
| 2010-12- || Win||align=left| || 2010 I.F.M.A. World Muaythai Championships, Semi Finals || Bangkok, Thailand || || ||

|-  style="background:#FFBBBB;"
| 2010-05- || Loss ||align=left| Abdulsalam Zaire || 2010 I.F.M.A. European Muaythai Championships, Semi Finals || Italy || Decision ||4 ||2:00
|-
! style=background:white colspan=9 |
|-
| colspan=9 | Legend:

See also
 List of male kickboxers

References 

1991 births
Living people
Ukrainian male kickboxers
Kunlun Fight kickboxers
Lightweight kickboxers
Sportspeople from Odesa
Ukrainian Muay Thai practitioners
Kunlun Fight kickboxing champions